At the 1932 Winter Olympics, two cross-country skiing events were contested. The 18 km competition was held on Wednesday, 10 February 1932, while the 50 km event was held on Saturday, 13 February 1932.

Medal summary

Medal table

Events

Participating nations
Cross-country skiers from Austria and France only competed in the 18 km event. Sixteen cross-country skiers competed in both events.

A total of 58 cross-country skiers from eleven nations competed at the Lake Placid Games:

References

External links
International Olympic Committee results database

 
1932 Winter Olympics
1932 Winter Olympics events
Olympics
Cross-country skiing competitions in the United States